Grand Lisboa is a 47-floor,  hotel in Sé, Macau. It is owned by Sociedade de Turismo e Diversões de Macau and designed by Hong Kong architects Dennis Lau and Ng Chun Man with the interiors created by Khuan Chew,  Design Principal of KCA International.  Its casino and restaurants were opened on February 11, 2007, while the hotel was opened in December 2008. The casino offers 800 gaming tables and 1,000 slot machines. The hotel contains 430 hotel rooms and suites. The Grand Lisboa is the tallest building in Macau and the most distinctive part of its skyline.

The casino is the first in Macau to offer Texas hold 'em poker ring games. It was also the first to offer craps, though several other casinos in Macau now offer the game.

In 2017 it was reported that the Grand Lisboa suffered a decline in revenue and profits during 2016.

Features

Venues
Joël Robuchon joined the group in 2007 as the owner of the hotel restaurant, Robuchon au Dome, which in 2008 was awarded three stars by the Michelin Guide when it was known as "Robuchon a Galera." The restaurant was renamed when it moved locations inside the hotel.  The wine list features over 14,600 wines and has won the Wine Spectator “Grand Award”. In January 2013, the Miele Guide named Robuchon Au Dome as the top restaurant in Asia. It is ranked number 6 in the world by Elite Traveler in 2016 and 2017.

Art and attractions
The Star of Stanley Ho is on permanent display at the Casino Grand Lisboa. According to the Gemological Institute of America, the  diamond is the largest cushion shaped internally flawless D-color diamond in the world.

Gallery

Paul Tsui picture 
The Invasion is a photograph by Paul Tsui, who was nominated for the National Geographic Travel Photographer of the Year award. The picture depicts a sideway view of the Grand Lisboa hotel, through a street with high buildings in Macau. It has been commented that it resembles an alien invasion.

See also
 List of Macau casinos
 Macau gaming law
 Gambling in Macau

References

External links

 Official Website - Grand Lisboa
 Hotel Website - Grand Lisboa Hotel
 Emporis.com - Grand Lisboa
 Famous Casino - Grand Lisboa
 SkycraperPage.com – Hotel & Casino Grand Lisboa
 Macau casinos and hotels reviews

Casinos completed in 2007
Hotel buildings completed in 2008
Casinos in Macau
Hotels in Macau
Sé, Macau
Skyscrapers in Macau
2007 establishments in Macau
Skyscraper hotels in Macau